Shaun David Udal (born 18 March 1969) is an English cricketer.  An off spin bowler and lower-middle order batsman, he was a member of England's Test team for their tours to Pakistan and India in 2005/06.

International career
He played in ten One Day Internationals in 1994 and 1995, including the winter tour of Australia, but did not play for the Test team at that time. It was not until September 2005, after an impressive season with Hampshire, that he was recalled to the England squad for their tour of Pakistan when they were looking for more spinners in addition to Ashley Giles.  He made his Test debut in the first Test of that tour at the age of 36. He disappointed somewhat, taking only three wickets in his first three Tests, although he did contribute some runs in the lower order.

However, he retained his place on the Indian tour for later that winter, and returned to the side for the third and final Test in Mumbai. He was instrumental in England's victory, taking figures of 4 wickets for 14 runs in the second innings, including the wicket of Sachin Tendulkar for 34 as England completed a 212 run victory.

With the continuing unavailability through injury of Ashley Giles, Udal started the 2006 season in contention with Monty Panesar for England's spinning berth. He was not, however picked for the opening three-Test series against Sri Lanka, nor for the Ashes tour of Australia which started in November 2006.

On 21 October 2005, against Pakistan he played his first ODI match after more than ten years, which is a record for England.

Domestic career

Hampshire
In the domestic game he played for Hampshire between 1989 and 2007. He helped the county win the 1991 NatWest Trophy, the 1992 Benson & Hedges Cup, and the 2005 Cheltenham & Gloucester Trophy, as captain in the final of the latter against Warwickshire, deputising for Shane Warne. During his time at Hampshire, he wrote a weekly article throughout the County Cricket season about his experiences the previous week for the Hampshire Chronicle.

Middlesex
On 17 September 2007 he announced his decision to retire from first-class cricket at the end of the 2007 season. On 30 October 2007 he joined minor county side Berkshire as their professional for the 2008 season
 and was also set to play for Henley in the Homes Counties League but on 4 December 2007, Udal returned to first-class cricket having signed a two-year deal with Middlesex.

On 25 October 2008, it was announced that he would be the Club Captain for the 2009 season.
On 6 April 2009 he was selected in the preliminary 30 man squad to represent England for the 2009 ICC World Twenty20.  During the 2010 County Championship, Udal took his 800th wicket, that of Gloucestershire bowler Steve Kirby.  Following an indifferent start to that season, he resigned as the County Captain on 11 June with immediate effect. Adam Gilchrist was appointed on an interim basis and led the county for five Twenty20 matches and a tourist fixture until his departure on 24 June. Neil Dexter took on the role permanently after this date.  At the end of the 2010 season, Udal announced his retirement from professional cricket.

References

External links

1969 births
Living people
English cricket captains
England One Day International cricketers
England Test cricketers
English cricketers
Hampshire cricketers
Middlesex cricketers
Hampshire cricket captains
Middlesex cricket captains
People from Farnborough, Hampshire
Berkshire cricketers
People with Parkinson's disease